Home Garden is a census-designated place (CDP) in Kings County, California, United States. It is part of the Hanford–Corcoran Metropolitan Statistical Area. The population was 1,761 at the 2010 United States Census.

Geography

Demographics

2010
At the 2010 census Home Garden had a population of 1,761. The racial makeup of Home Garden was 652 (37.0%) White, 221 (12.5%) African American, 63 (3.6%) Native American, 50 (2.8%) Asian, 8 (0.5%) Pacific Islander, 677 (38.4%) from other races, and 90 (5.1%) from two or more races. Hispanic or Latino of any race were 1,189 persons (67.5%).

The census reported that 1,753 people (99.5% of the population) lived in households, 8 (0.5%) lived in non-institutionalized group quarters, and no one was institutionalized.

There were 437 households, 252 (57.7%) had children under the age of 18 living in them, 214 (49.0%) were opposite-sex married couples living together, 112 (25.6%) had a female householder with no husband present, 50 (11.4%) had a male householder with no wife present.  There were 49 (11.2%) unmarried opposite-sex partnerships, and 1 (0.2%) same-sex married couples or partnerships. 42 households (9.6%) were one person and 18 (4.1%) had someone living alone who was 65 or older. The average household size was 4.01.  There were 376 families (86.0% of households); the average family size was 4.16.

The age distribution was 601 people (34.1%) under the age of 18, 203 people (11.5%) aged 18 to 24, 440 people (25.0%) aged 25 to 44, 368 people (20.9%) aged 45 to 64, and 149 people (8.5%) who were 65 or older.  The median age was 27.9 years. For every 100 females, there were 100.8 males.  For every 100 females age 18 and over, there were 100.7 males.

There were 461 housing units at an average density of 747.1 per square mile, of the occupied units 210 (48.1%) were owner-occupied and 227 (51.9%) were rented. The homeowner vacancy rate was 4.5%; the rental vacancy rate was 2.6%.  786 people (44.6% of the population) lived in owner-occupied housing units and 967 people (54.9%) lived in rental housing units.

2000
At the 2000 census there were 1,702 people, 427 households, and 368 families in the CDP. The racial makeup of the CDP was 33.49% White, 12.93% Black or African American, 2.41% Native American, 7.29% Asian, 0.18% Pacific Islander, 37.07% from other races, and 6.64% from two or more races.  55.17% of the population were Hispanic or Latino of any race.
Of the 427 households 48.5% had children under the age of 18 living with them, 55.0% were married couples living together, 21.3% had a female householder with no husband present, and 13.8% were non-families. 10.8% of households were one person and 4.9% were one person aged 65 or older.  The average household size was 3.95 and the average family size was 4.10.

The age distribution was 37.9% under the age of 18, 9.4% from 18 to 24, 26.3% from 25 to 44, 18.9% from 45 to 64, and 7.5% 65 or older.  The median age was 27 years. For every 100 females, there were 112.2 males.  For every 100 females age 18 and over, there were 112.2 males.

Economy
At the time of the 2000 census, the median household income was $25,450, and the median family income  was $24,214. Males had a median income of $26,071 versus $14,338 for females. The per capita income for the CDP was $22,357. About 33.5% of families and 41.9% of the population were below the poverty line, including 53.5% of those under age 18 and 24.4% of those age 65 or over.  The estimated unemployment rate was 12.6% in November 2016.

Politics
Home Garden is part of California's 21st congressional district, which is held by Republican David Valadao. The community is represented in the California State Senate by Democrat Michael Rubio and in the California State Assembly by Democrat Rudy Salas.

Home Garden is represented on the Kings County Board of Supervisors by Richard Valle of Corcoran.

References

External links
Home Garden Community Assessment, Central Valley Health Policy Institute, May 2007

Census-designated places in Kings County, California
Hanford, California
Census-designated places in California